Surat Lok Sabha constituency is one of the 26 Lok Sabha (parliamentary) constituencies in Gujarat. Veteran BJP strongman Kashiram Rana has been an MP from this seat for 6 terms. Surat was also the constituency of the 7th Prime Minister of India Morarji Desai, who has been an MP for this constituency for 5 terms. Surat has elected BJP leaders as MP since 1989 with overwhelming margins.

Assembly Segments

Member of Parliament

Election Results

2019 General Elections

2014 General Elections

2009 General Elections

2004 General Elections

1999 General Elections

1998 General Elections

1996 General Elections

1991 General Elections

1989 General Elections

1984 General Elections

1980 General Elections

1977 General Elections

1971 General Elections

1967 General Elections

1962 General Elections

See also
 Surat district
 List of Constituencies of the Lok Sabha

Notes

Lok Sabha constituencies in Gujarat
Surat
Year of establishment missing